James Sinclair (1913–1968) was a Scottish botanist, who worked at the Royal Botanic Garden Edinburgh and the Singapore Botanic Gardens.

Life 
Sinclair was born in the Bu of Hoy Orkney, Scotland on 29 November 1913. He received a degree in botany from the Edinburgh University. He served as a radar operator in the Royal Air Force from 1941 to 1945. In 1968 he succumbed to cancer and was buried in Hoy.

Work 
He was a botanist at the Edinburgh Royal Botanical Garden where he oversaw the herbarium. In 1948 he became the herbarium curator at the Singapore Botanic Gardens. Much of his work focused on the flowering plant families Annonaceae and Myristicaceae, though he also had an interest in marine plants and mosses.

Legacy 
He is the authority for at least 192 taxa including: 
His life and works have been honored as part of the Hoy Heritage project.

References 

1913 births
1968 deaths
Scottish botanists
Royal Air Force personnel of World War II